Ashland is an Amtrak intercity train station in Ashland, Virginia, serving Northeast Regional trains bound for Richmond, Newport News and Norfolk as well as many points north. The station is also designated as Ashland's visitor center. The tracks are lined with a cobblestone median in the center of town, making it a popular train-watching site for railfans.

History

The station was built by the Richmond, Fredericksburg and Potomac Railroad in 1923, replacing a station which was originally built in 1866 and rebuilt in 1890. The station was closed in 1967, but reopened in 1985. It was originally served by the Colonial, and through numerous route changes over the years is now served by Hampton Roads-bound Northeast Regionals.

The Ashland station was racially segregated, like many railroad stations in the Southeastern U.S. built before the 1960s. It had separate waiting rooms for whites and blacks, served by a single ticket booth in the center of the building. The former black waiting room is now a museum filled with various RF&P railroad artifacts, including blueprints, model railroad trains, a bench that was once on display at the Smithsonian Museum, local newspaper and locally related magazine articles.

Construction of new platforms and mobile lifts for accessibility was completed in June 2022.

References

External links 

 Ashland, Virginia Amtrak Station (USA Rail Guide -- Train Web)
 Ashland, Virginia Tourist Department

1866 establishments in Virginia
Amtrak stations in Virginia
Buildings and structures in Hanover County, Virginia
Ashland
Railway stations in the United States opened in 1866
Transportation in Hanover County, Virginia